Lake Shore Apartments is a historic apartment building at 470-498 Sheridan Road in Evanston, Illinois. The three-story building was built in 1927. Its location was chosen to provide views of Lake Michigan and relative distance from Evanston's busier commercial areas; to compensate for this, the owners provided residents with transportation to local schools and public transit stations. Architect Roy F. France, who also designed several other Evanston apartment buildings, designed the building in the Georgian Revival style. The building features a brick exterior with terra cotta detailing, projecting bays and bow windows, and an arcade leading to a private courtyard.

The building was added to the National Register of Historic Places on March 15, 1984.

References

Buildings and structures on the National Register of Historic Places in Cook County, Illinois
Residential buildings on the National Register of Historic Places in Illinois
Buildings and structures in Evanston, Illinois
Apartment buildings in Illinois
Georgian Revival architecture in Illinois
Residential buildings completed in 1927